Eraser Children is a 2009 Australian film directed by Nathan Christoffel.

The director talked about the film in an interview for Film Ink magazine in 2008.

The film has been selected to premiere at Londons Sci-Fi-London off the viewing of the first edit. Though the film was withdrawn from competition due to post production not being complete . The film has been selected to have a preview screening at the closing night of the Melbourne Underground Film Festival in August 2009. It will have its World Premiere as the opening night film of the Sydney International Sci Fi Film Festival.

Sydney International Sci Fi Film festival co-director Lisa Mitchell said. "Director Nathan Christoffel and his cast and crew, deserve to be warmly congratulated. To have independently produced such a visually and conceptually sophisticated film as their feature debut is a major accomplishment and a testament to the creativity of Australian genre cinema."

A trailer for the film was released in mid-2009.

An unfinished version of the film was first screened at the Melbourne Underound Film Festival in 2009. The film went on to win 'Best Australian Film' and 'Best supporting actor' – Shane Nagle at the festival awards.

References

External links
 
 

2009 science fiction films
2009 films
Australian science fiction films
Dystopian films
2000s English-language films
2000s Australian films